is a Japanese motorcycle racer.

Career statistics

Grand Prix motorcycle racing

By season

Races by year
(key)

External links
Profile on MotoGP.com

Japanese motorcycle racers
1983 births
Living people
125cc World Championship riders